The 1970–71 French Division 2 season was the 30th season since its establishment. It was constituted by three geographic groups (North, Center and South) with 16 clubs each. The winners of each group won promotion to the 1971–72 French Division 1. Additionally, the winners met once in the championship play–offs. The club with most points was crowned champion and awarded the trophy.

Meanwhile, all reserves teams were relegated at the end of the season, regardless of their final position, due to the creation of the Division 3, which would also serve as the top league for amateur clubs and the club's reserves sides.

The season began on 23 August 1970 and ended on 12 June 1971. The winter break was in effect from 27 December 1970 to 10 January 1971. Two points were awarded for a win, with no points for a loss. If the match was drawn, each team received one point.

League tables

Group North

Group Center

Group South

Championship play-offs

Table

Matches

References

External links
France - List of final tables (RSSSF)

Ligue 2 seasons
French
2